Narasimha Jayanti is a Hindu festival that is celebrated on the fourteenth day of the Hindu month of Vaisakha. Hindus regard it to be the date the deity Vishnu assumed his Narasimha avatara to vanquish the oppressive asura-king, Hiranyakashipu.

Legend 

In Hindu mythology, Hiranyakashipu was the first wicked incarnation of Jaya, one of the two doorkeepers of Vishnu's abode of Vaikuntha. After being cursed by the Four Kumaras, along with his brother, Vijaya, he chose to be born as an enemy of Vishnu thrice, rather than as a devotee of the deity seven times. After the death of his brother, Hiranyaksha, at the hands of Varaha, the third avatara of Vishnu, Hiranyakashipu swore revenge. The king performed a severe penance to propitiate the creator deity, Brahma, until the latter appeared to grant him a boon. The asura desired the inability to be slain neither inside his house nor outside, by day nor night, by any weapon, neither on the ground nor in the sky, by neither men nor beasts, deva nor asura, nor any being created by Brahma. He also asked for rulership of all living beings and the three worlds. His wish granted, Hiranyakashipu overran the three worlds with his invincibility and his forces, seizing the throne of Indra in Svarga, and subjugating all beings, except the Trimurti, under his rule.

The asura king's son, Prahlada, grew devoted to Vishnu, due to spending his childhood at Narada's ashrama. Angered that his son prayed to his sworn enemy, Hiranyakashipu attempted to indoctrinate him under various teachers, including Shukra, but to no avail. The king determined that such a son must die. He employed poison, snakes, elephants, fire, and warriors to slay Prahlada, but the boy was saved by praying to Vishnu on each attempt. When the royal priests attempted to indoctrinate the prince once more, he converted the other pupils to Vaishnavism. The priests created a trishula (trident) to murder the boy, but it slew them instead, after which Prahlada restored them to life. Shambarasura and Vayu were tasked with killing him, but failed. Finally, the asura had his son tied to nooses of snakes, and hurled into the ocean, with mountains launched to crush him. Prahlada remained unscathed. Frustrated, Hiranyakashipu demanded to know where Vishnu resided, and Prahlada responded that he was omnipresent. He asked his son if Vishnu lived in a pillar of his chamber, and the latter affirmed in response. Furious, the king smashed the pillar with his mace, whence Narasimha, part-man, part-lion, appeared before him. The avatara dragged Hiranyakashipu to the doorway of the palace, and ripped him apart with his claws, his form placed upon his lap, during twilight. Thus, circumventing the boon granted to the asura king, Narasimha was able to rescue his devotee, and restore order to the universe.

History 
Narasimha Jayanti is referenced in the Padma Purana and Skanda Purana as Narasimha Chaturdashi. The worship of Narasimha has been present in South India for millennia, with the Pallava dynasty popularising the sect and its practices. Inscriptions have also been found referring to the occasion dating back to the Vijayanagara Empire.

Religious practices 
Narasimha Jayanti is primarily observed by Vaishnavas, the adherents of Vishnu, in the South Indian states of Karnataka, Andhra Pradesh, and northern Tamil Nadu, where the veneration of Narasimha is popular. Narasimha and Lakshmi Narasimha temples throughout the aforementioned regions hold special pujas in honour of the deity during various time periods of the occasion. In the household, the shodashopachara puja is performed in the morning, and the panchopachara puja is performed in the evening, both by men.

The Bhagavata Mela dance is performed on this occasion in a public performance in Melattur. 

Members of the Sri Vaishnava tradition traditionally observe fasting until the evening, and consume food after prayer. A beverage called panakam is prepared from jaggery and water, and is distributed to the Brahmins during the festivities. 

In Karnataka, community feasts are organised by certain temples to celebrate the occasion.

See also 

 Krishna Janmashtami
 Rama Navami
 Hanuman Jayanti

References 
Vaishnavism

Hindu festivals
Festivals in Andhra Pradesh
Festivals in Tamil Nadu
Festivals in Karnataka